A nerd is a person who is intellectually knowledgeable or bright, but socially inept.

Nerd(s) or The Nerd(s) may also refer to:

Arts and entertainment
 Nerd, a fictional creature from Dr. Seuss's 1950 book If I Ran the Zoo; often considered the first printed modern English appearance of the word
The Nerd, a character from the Adult Swim animated series Robot Chicken
NERD (television production company), a company associated with Survivor creator Charlie Parsons
FC Nerds, reality television sports franchise
Nerds FC, a 2006 Australian television soccer documentary series 
The Nerds, a 1979 series of Saturday Night Live sketches
N.E.R.D.S., a book series
The Nerd (play), a 1981 Broadway comedy play written by American actor/playwright Larry Shue
N.E.R.D, a rock/hip hop group fronted by Pharrell Williams
The Nerd, the main character from Angry Video Game Nerd, a web series that started in 2004.
Nerds 2.0.1, a 1998 documentary film
Rhett & Link, releasing the "Epic Rap Battle: Nerd vs. Geek".

Medicine
NERDS syndrome, Nodules–eosinophilia–rheumatism–dermatitis–swelling syndrome
Nonerosive reflux disease, a form of gastroesophageal reflux disease

Technology
NeRD, Navy eReader Device, e-reader developed by the United States Navy
Nintendo European Research & Development, a software development firm
NERD, a science and technology journal published by students of the Indian Institute of Technology Kanpur

Other uses
NERD (sabermetrics), a baseball statistic 
Nerds (candy), a candy
N3RD Street, Philadelphia; "Nerd Street" aka "North Third Street"

See also
 NERTZ, a podcast by Mathew Klickstein
King of the Nerds, an American game shows series from 2013
King of the Nerds (British TV series), a British version from 2015
Revenge of the Nerds (film series)
Nurd (disambiguation)